Irwin Belk Stadium is a 3,500-seat stadium in Wingate, North Carolina. It is home to the Wingate University Bulldogs football team.

The stadium is named for Irwin Belk, who has donated large sums of money to many colleges and universities in the Charlotte area, including UNC Charlotte and Johnson C. Smith University. The field is named for John R. Martin.

External links
 Wingate University - Facilities

Sports venues in North Carolina
College football venues
Buildings and structures in Union County, North Carolina
Wingate Bulldogs football
American football venues in North Carolina